The county governor of Agder county in Norway represents the central government administration in the county.

Agder county (with its current borders) was established on 1 January 2020 after the merger of the old Aust-Agder and Vest-Agder counties. In anticipation for this merger, the government of Norway merged the offices of County Governor of Aust-Agder and County Governor of Vest-Agder into one office starting on 1 January 2016.

The county governor is the government's representative in the county. The governor carries out the resolutions and guidelines of the Storting and government. This is done first by the county governor performing administrative tasks on behalf of the ministries. Secondly, the county governor also monitors the activities of the municipalities and is the appeal body for many types of municipal decisions.

Name
Then on 1 January 2021, the title was changed again to the gender-neutral .

List of county governors
Agder county has had the following governors:

See also
For the county governors of this area prior to 2016, see: 
List of county governors of Aust-Agder
List of county governors of Vest-Agder

References

Agder
County Governor